Carmen Delgado is a Mexican actress. She studied acting at Centro Universitario de Teatro.

Trajectory 
2021 Madre sólo hay dos ... Laura Villa
2015 Así en el barrio como en el cielo ... La pechu
2013 Vivir a Destiempo ... Chole
2012 Amor Cautivo ... 
2012 A Corazón Abierto ... 
2011 Emperatriz ...Graciela "Gata" Mendoza
2009 Vuélveme A Querer ... Rosa María
2008 Pobre Rico Pobre ... Lucero
2007 Bellezas Indomables ... Carmen
2007 Lo que se hereda no se hurta
2006 Montecristo ... Helena
2004 Belinda...  Gardenia (2004)
2003 Desde Gayola... La Chata
2002 Súbete A Mi Moto ... Carmen
2001 Cuando Seas Mía ...  Constanza de Sandoval
2001 Honey for Oshun
2001 Lo que callamos las mujeres  – Hasta que la muerte nos separe (2001) … Olga
2000 En el país de no pasa nada ... Yadir
2000 El tío Alberto ... Vanessa
2000 His Most Serene Highness
1999 Háblame de amor … Esther
1998 Demasiado corazón
1998 Yacaranday ... Cecilia
1998 La casa del naranjo ... Fidela
1997 Para morir en video (short)
1996 A flor de piel ... Silvia (1996)
1996 Cuentos para solitarios  – Para morir en video
1992 Makinavaja - 'El último choriso'
1988 El tiempo de los dioses
1987 La indomable... Cristina
1987 El cristal empañado ... Marisela
1986 Ave Fénix ... Irma
1984 Aprendiendo a vivir ... Raquel
1983 Asalto al Banco Central
1983 Un solo corazón ... Catalina
1980 No temas al amor ... Marcela
1980 Caminemos

References

External links

20th-century Mexican actresses
Living people
21st-century Mexican actresses
Actresses from Mexico City
Mexican film actresses
Year of birth missing (living people)